Spellbound is the second album by British heavy metal band Tygers of Pan Tang, produced in 1981 on MCA. Spellbound is the first of two full length Tygers of Pan Tang albums to feature John Sykes as second guitarist, who later joined Thin Lizzy and Whitesnake. It is also the first album with vocalist Jon Deverill.
The album was re-issued in 1989 in a double-LP package with Wild Cat and on CD in 1997 with bonus tracks.

"Hellbound" was covered by American thrash metal band Heathen as a bonus track for the album Victims of Deception as well as German NWOBHM tribute act Roxxcalibur on their 2011 sophomore release, Lords of the NWOBHM, while "Gangland" was covered by German thrash metal band Kreator in 1987 on their "Behind the Mirror" single and on 1988 EP Out of the Dark... Into the Light.

Track listing

Tracks 7 and 9 were switched on the 1989 double LP vinyl reissue and 1989 CD reissue.

Personnel 
Band members
Jon Deverill – lead and backing vocals
Robb Weir – lead guitar, backing vocals
John Sykes – lead guitar, backing vocals
Richard "Rocky" Laws – bass, backing vocals
Brian "Big" Dick – drums

Production
Chris Tsangarides – producer, engineer
Andrew Warwick – assistant engineer

Charts

Album

Singles
Hellbound

|}

References

1981 albums
Tygers of Pan Tang albums
MCA Records albums
Albums produced by Chris Tsangarides
Albums recorded at Morgan Sound Studios